Lizzie Roper (born 1967) is a British actress.

Career
Trained at the Guildford School of Acting after gaining a degree in drama from Aberystwyth University. Lizzie fell into Comedy whilst performing with Lenny Beige at The Regency Rooms as Sadie Beige -The Kosher chicken Giblet Queen of Whitechapel, Naomi Beige and Rita Poonarni-a brash Spanish singer with a penchant for Shirley Bassey numbers.  In the late 1990s Roper also Performed stand Up and regularly hosted her own club, 'Loonatics at the Asylum' on Rathbone Place W1 as well as regular appearances on the Edinburgh Fringe. Her first major TV role was in The Worst Week of My Life playing Trish in 2004. In the same year, Roper appeared alongside Christian Slater in the West End production of One Flew Over The Cuckoo's Nest. In 2005 Roper was performing at the Edinburgh Festival With Alan Davies and Bill Bailey in The Odd Couple. In 2006, Roper devised and appeared in her second solo show, Peccadillo Circus at the Edinburgh Festival. It garnered a nomination for The Stage's Best solo Performance and transferred to the West End at the Trafalgar Studios before going on a National Tour. For the role she researched and interviewed members of the public about their sex lives.

In 2011, Roper was in the West End musical comedy Betwixt!. taking over from Ellen Greene. From 2013 to 2014, Roper appeared as Sam Lomax in Hollyoaks. When she finally left she went straight back to The Edinburgh Fringe Festival in another one woman show in which she played the journalist Julie Burchill in Julie Burchill: Absolute Cult, a play written by Tim Fountain and directed by Mike Bradwell. In 2015 and 2016, Roper appeared as Jackie in Boy Meets Girl, a romantic comedy in which the main character is a transgender woman. In 2020, she was a signatory alongside Alexander Armstrong, Simon Fanshawe and Frances Barber in the Sunday Times calling out hate speech,‘the appalling hashtag #RIPJKRowling is just the latest example of hate speech directed against her and other women. #IStandWithJKRowling' .

She has appeared as herself in Alan Davies: As Yet Untitled, Celebrity Storage Hunters, The Wright Stuff, Jason Manford on Absolute Radio and Co-hosted on LBC regularly with Jenny Eclair.

Since 2009, Roper portrays Mabel in adverts for Aunt Bessie's.

Since October 2021, Roper has been presenting the weekday mid-morning show (10am-2pm) on BBC Radio Guernsey featuring music, interviews etc. On 14/1/22, Roper stepped down from presenting the mid-morning show and will be replaced by Lynne Coleman from 24/1/22

Since 3 September 2022, Roper has been presenting the Channel Islands regional weekend mid-morning show

Selected filmography

References

External links
 

British film actresses
British stage actresses
British television actresses
British soap opera actresses
21st-century British actresses
Living people
1967 births
English soap opera actresses
20th-century British actresses
20th-century English women
20th-century English people
21st-century English women
21st-century English people